Gymnura japonica, the Japanese butterfly ray , is a species of ray in the family Gymnuridae. It is found from Japan to Cambodia.

References
 Masuda, H., K. Amaoka, C. Araga, T. Uyeno and T. Yoshino, 1984. The Fishes of the Japanese Archipelago. Vol. 1. Tokai University Press, Tokyo, Japan. 437 p. (text). (Ref. 559)

japonica
Fish described in 1850